Huenna (minor planet designation: 379 Huenna) is a large asteroid orbiting in the asteroid belt. It is part of the Themis family, and thus a C-type asteroid and consequently composed mainly of carbonaceous material.

It was discovered by Auguste Charlois on 8 January 1894 in Nice. It is the Latin name for the Swedish island of Ven, the site of two observatories. This island is where Tycho Brahe built his observatory.

A satellite, 7 km across and designated S/2003 (379) 1, was discovered on 14 August 2003 by Jean-Luc Margot using the Keck II adaptive optics telescope at Mauna Kea. The moon orbits 3400±11 km away in 80.8±0.36 d with an eccentricity of 0.334±0.075. The system is loosely bound as Huenna has a Hill sphere with a radius of about 20,000 km.

References

External links 
 Lightcurve plot of 379 Huenna, Palmer Divide Observatory, B. D. Warner (2010)
 Asteroids with Satellites, Robert Johnston, johnstonsarchive.net
 Asteroid Lightcurve Database (LCDB), query form (info )
 Dictionary of Minor Planet Names, Google books
 Asteroids and comets rotation curves, CdR – Observatoire de Genève, Raoul Behrend
 Discovery Circumstances: Numbered Minor Planets (1)-(5000) – Minor Planet Center
 Orbits of Binary Asteroids with Adaptive Optics (VLT images, archived)
 
 

000379
Discoveries by Auguste Charlois
Named minor planets
000379
000379
000379
18940108